Karl Ast (pseudonym: Karl Rumor, 19 February 1886, Orava – 9 July 1971, New York City) was an Estonian writer and politician.

Life 
Ast's older brother, Gottlieb Ast, was the mayor of Tallinn in 1919. Karl attended the renowned Hugo Treffner Gymnasium in Tartu. Ast supported the Russian Revolution of 1905 and was imprisoned in Riga for a period from 1907 to 1910 as a result of his criticism of the authoritarian regime of the Tsar. He participated in the First World War in the Russian Imperial Army.

With the attainment of independence of the Republic of Estonia, Karl Ast entered politics. He was a member of the Estonian Constituent Assembly in 1919. From 1919 to 1933 he was a member of the Estonian Parliament (Riigikogu). Between 1933 and 1939 he traveled the world (including the capitals of Europe, North Africa, India, Japan, China) and had written numerous travel accounts and reports. In 1939 he was Estonian press attaché in Sweden.

During the Second World War, Karl Ast emigrated from Europe, settling in Brazil, then in Canada and eventually in the U.S. He served with the Estonian government in exile until 1959.

Literary work 

Karl Ast's literary debut came in 1911, shortly after his release from Tzarist imprisonment with the short story collection  (The mosquitoes in the storm). In 1923/24 he was chairman of the Estonian Writers' Union. In addition to numerous short stories he wrote a novel (Krutsifiks, 1960), two volumes of memoirs and numerous travel books. His short stories made him one of the most popular exile writers of his time.

Main works 
  (1911, short stories and sketches)
  (1913, prose poem)
  (1913, short stories)
  (1920, under the pseudonym Kaarlo Orawa)
  (1921, short stories)
  (1926, short stories)
  (1928, short stories)
  (1928, romantic drama)
  (1929, erotic short stories)
  (1930/31, travel reports)
  (1936, travelogue)
  (1943, a political treatise)
  (1953, short stories)
  (1959, short stories)
  (1960, novel)
  (1962, short stories)
  (1963–65, memories, 2 volumes)
  (1971, short stories)
  (1991, short stories)
  (1995, story)
  (2007, essays, edited by Hando Runnel)

References 

1886 births
1971 deaths
People from Võru Parish
People from Kreis Werro
Estonian Social Democratic Workers' Party politicians
Estonian Socialist Workers' Party politicians
Members of the Estonian Provincial Assembly
Members of the Estonian Constituent Assembly
Members of the Riigikogu, 1920–1923
Members of the Riigikogu, 1923–1926
Members of the Riigikogu, 1926–1929
Members of the Riigikogu, 1929–1932
Members of the Riigikogu, 1932–1934
Estonian male poets
Estonian male short story writers
20th-century Estonian poets
21st-century Estonian writers
Hugo Treffner Gymnasium alumni
Russian military personnel of World War I
Estonian World War II refugees
Estonian emigrants to the United States